Cyren may refer to:

Cyren, band in which Jani Lane played

 CYREN, an Internet security company
CYREN (protein)

See also
 Cyrene (disambiguation)